Rutendo Makore (born 30 September 1992) is a Zimbabwean footballer who plays as a forward for the Zimbabwe women's national team.

She represented her country in their Olympic debut at the 2016 Summer Olympics.

In the Olympic match versus Germany it was Makore who set up a goal that took their goalkeeper Almuth Schult by surprise. The ball was rebounded but Kudakwashe Basopo made it a goal leaving the score at 6–1 against Zimbabwe.

International goals

References

External links
 

1992 births
Living people
Zimbabwean women's footballers
Zimbabwean expatriate footballers
Sporting de Huelva players
Primera División (women) players
Zimbabwe women's international footballers
Footballers at the 2016 Summer Olympics
Olympic footballers of Zimbabwe
Zimbabwean expatriate sportspeople in Spain
Expatriate footballers in Spain
Women's association football forwards